This is a list of airports that America West Airlines flew to as of September 24, 2007, and does not include cities only served by America West Express which are listed at America West Express destinations. America West Airlines is a subsidiary of the US Airways Group.

For all of the destinations served by the US Airways Group, including US Airways, US Airways Express, America West Airlines, and America West Express, see US Airways Destinations.


Destinations served at time of merger with US Airways

North America

Canada
Alberta
Calgary (Calgary International Airport)
Edmonton (Edmonton International Airport)
British Columbia
Vancouver (Vancouver International Airport)
Cranbrook (Canadian Rockies International Airport) - Charter
Ontario
Toronto (Toronto Pearson International Airport)

Mexico
Baja California
Los Cabos (Los Cabos International Airport)
Colima
Manzanillo (Playa de Oro International Airport) - Seasonal
Federal District
Mexico City (Mexico City International Airport)
Guerrero
Acapulco (General Juan N. Álvarez International Airport)
Ixtapa-Zihuatanejo (Ixtapa-Zihuatanejo International Airport) - Seasonal
Jalisco
Guadalajara (Don Miguel Hidalgo y Costilla International Airport)
Puerto Vallarta (Lic. Gustavo Díaz Ordaz International Airport)
Quintana Roo
Cancun (Cancun International Airport)
Sinaloa
Mazatlán (General Rafael Buelna International Airport)
Sonora
Guaymas (Guaymas International Airport)
Hermosillo (General Ignacio Pesqueira Garcia International Airport)

United States
Alaska
Anchorage (Ted Stevens Anchorage International Airport)
Arizona
Phoenix (Phoenix Sky Harbor International Airport) -  Hub
Tucson (Tucson International Airport)
California
Burbank (Bob Hope Airport)
Carlsbad  (McClellan–Palomar Airport)
Fresno (Fresno Yosemite International Airport)
Long Beach (Long Beach airport)
Los Angeles (Los Angeles International Airport)
Oakland (Oakland International Airport)
Ontario (Ontario International Airport)
 Palm Springs (Palm Springs International Airport)
Sacramento (Sacramento International Airport)
San Diego (San Diego International Airport)
San Francisco (San Francisco International Airport)
San Jose (San Jose International Airport)
Santa Ana, Orange County (John Wayne Airport)
Santa Barbara (Santa Barbara Municipal Airport)
Colorado
 Colorado Springs (Colorado Springs Municipal Airport)
Denver (Denver International Airport)
 Durango (Durango-La Plata County Airport)
 Grand Junction (Grand Junction Regional Airport)
Connecticut
Hartford/Springfield, Massachusetts (Bradley International Airport)
Florida
Fort Lauderdale (Fort Lauderdale-Hollywood International Airport)
Miami (Miami International Airport)
Orlando (Orlando International Airport)
Tampa Bay Area (Tampa International Airport)
West Palm Beach (Palm Beach International Airport)
Georgia
Atlanta (Hartsfield-Jackson Atlanta International Airport)
Hawaii
Honolulu (Honolulu International Airport)
Kahului (Kahului Airport) - via Hawaiian Airlines code share service
Kailua-Kona (Kona International Airport) - via Hawaiian Airlines code share service
Lihue (Lihue Airport) - via Hawaiian Airlines code share service
Idaho
Boise (Boise Airport)
Illinois
Chicago (O'Hare International Airport)
Indiana
Indianapolis (Indianapolis International Airport)
Maryland
Baltimore (Baltimore/Washington International Airport)
Massachusetts
Boston (Logan International Airport)
Michigan
Detroit (Detroit Metropolitan Wayne County Airport)
Minnesota
Minneapolis/Saint Paul (Minneapolis-Saint Paul International Airport)
Missouri
Kansas City (Kansas City International Airport)
Saint Louis (Lambert-Saint Louis International Airport)
Montana
Kalispell (Glacier Park International Airport)
Nebraska
Omaha (Eppley Airfield)
Nevada
Las Vegas (McCarran International Airport) - Hub
Reno (Reno/Tahoe International Airport)
New Jersey
Newark (Newark Liberty International Airport)
New Mexico
Albuquerque (Albuquerque International Sunport)
New York
New York City  (John F. Kennedy International Airport)
North Carolina
Raleigh/Durham (Raleigh-Durham International Airport)
Ohio
Cleveland (Cleveland Hopkins International Airport)
Columbus (Port Columbus International Airport) - Former hub
Oklahoma
Oklahoma City (Will Rogers World Airport)
Oregon
Portland (Portland International Airport)
Pennsylvania
Philadelphia (Philadelphia International Airport)
Pittsburgh (Pittsburgh International Airport)
Tennessee
Memphis (Memphis International Airport)
Texas
Austin (Austin-Bergstrom International Airport)
Dallas/Fort Worth (Dallas/Fort Worth International Airport)
El Paso (El Paso International Airport)
Houston (George Bush Intercontinental Airport)
San Antonio (San Antonio International Airport)
Utah
Salt Lake City (Salt Lake City International Airport)
Virginia
Washington, DC area
(Dulles International Airport)
(Ronald Reagan Washington National Airport)
Washington
Seattle/Tacoma (Seattle-Tacoma International Airport)
Spokane (Spokane International Airport)
Wisconsin
Milwaukee (General Mitchell International Airport)

Central America

Costa Rica
San José (Juan Santamaría International Airport)

Former destinations with service ended prior to merger with US Airways
America West had discontinued service to the following destinations prior to its merger with US Airways.  This destination information is taken from America West route maps from 1983 to 2003 and includes America West Express destinations:

Asia

Japan
 Nagoya (Nagoya Airfield) - According to the US Airways page, in 1991 as the United States entered the Gulf War, the Prime Minister of Japan told the Japanese people not to fly on United States airlines, thus causing a drop in traffic. America West then ceased flying Boeing 747 service the Nagoya-Honolulu route and sold the traffic rights to Northwest Airlines.

North America

Mexico
Nuevo León
Monterrey (General Mariano Escobedo International Airport)

United States 

Arizona

 Grand Canyon National Park (Grand Canyon National Park Airport)
 Flagstaff (Flagstaff Pulliam Airport)
 Yuma (Yuma International Airport)

California

 Palmdale (Palmdale Regional Airport)

Colorado

 Montrose (Montrose Regional Airport)
 Pueblo (Pueblo Memorial Airport)
 Steamboat Springs (Yampa Valley Airport)
 Vail (Eagle County Regional Airport)

Florida

 Fort Myers (Southwest Florida International Airport) - Seasonal

Idaho
 
 Sun Valley (Friedman Memorial Airport) - America West was the only airline ever to serve Sun Valley with Boeing 737 jet aircraft.

Illinois

Chicago (Midway Airport)
Moline (Quad Cities International Airport)

Iowa

Cedar Rapids (The Eastern Iowa Airport)
Des Moines (Des Moines International Airport)
Sioux City (Sioux Gateway Airport)

Kansas

Wichita (Wichita Dwight D. Eisenhower National Airport)

Louisiana

New Orleans (Louis Armstrong New Orleans International Airport) - Service was abruptly halted in the aftermath of Hurricane Katrina in August 2005 and the Phoenix-New Orleans route never resumed following the merger with US Airways.

Missouri

Springfield (Springfield-Branson National Airport)

Nebraska

Lincoln (Lincoln Municipal Airport)

New York

New York City (LaGuardia Airport)

Texas

Lubbock (Lubbock Preston Smith International Airport)
Midland/Odessa (Midland International Airport)

References

Lists of airline destinations
America West Holdings